Ethan Lewis (born 28 March 1994) is a Welsh rugby union player who plays as a hooker for Saracens. He was a Wales under-18 and under-20 international.

Lewis made his debut for the Cardiff Blues in 2014 having previously played for their academy and Cardiff RFC.

He joined Saracens, firstly on loan, in 2021, before joining permanently.

References

External links 
Cardiff Blues Player Profile

1994 births
Living people
Cardiff Rugby players
People educated at Treorchy Comprehensive School
Rugby union players from Church Village
Welsh rugby union players
Rugby union hookers
Saracens F.C. players